Grace Walton Roosevelt (married name Appleton Clark) (June 3, 1867 – November 29, 1945) was an American tennis player of the end of the 19th century, born in Hyde Park, New York.

Early life
She was the daughter of John Aspinwall Roosevelt, an estate proprietor, and Ellen Murray Crosby. She started playing tennis with her sister Ellen in 1879 when her father installed a tennis court at their mansion.

Career
In 1889, she won the unofficial mixed doubles title at the U.S. National Championship with A.E. Wright. She won the doubles title in 1890 with her sister Ellen, defeating compatriots Margarette Ballard and Bertha Townsend in two sets.

Grand Slam finals

Doubles (1 title, 1 runner-up)

Mixed doubles (1 title, 1 runner-up)

Personal life
In 1895, she married lawyer Appleton LeSure Clark and had two sons, Russell and Roosevelt. She returned to her parents' mansion after her husband's death in 1930. She was a first cousin of Franklin Delano Roosevelt,  president of the United States.

References

1867 births
1945 deaths
American female tennis players
American people of Dutch descent
People from Hyde Park, New York
Grace
Tennis people from New York (state)
United States National champions (tennis)
Grand Slam (tennis) champions in women's doubles